Koka railway station serves Koka and surrounding villages in Bhandara district in Maharashtra, India.

Electrification
The entire main line is electrified. The Gondia–Bhandara Road section was electrified in 1990–91. and Koka is located between Bhandara Road–Gondia section of electrification.

References

Railway stations in Bhandara district
Nagpur SEC railway division